In 1984–85 season, FK Sarajevo played in the Yugoslav First League and became the champion for the second time in the history of the club.

Players

Squad

(Captain)

Statistics

Kit

Competitions

Yugoslav First League

League table

References

FK Sarajevo seasons
Sarajevo
Yugoslav football championship-winning seasons